Kurt Eckstein (born 12 March 1947) is a German politician from the Christian Social Union of Bavaria. He has been a member of the Landtag of Bavaria since 1990.

References

1947 births
Living people
People from Nürnberger Land
Members of the Landtag of Bavaria
Christian Social Union in Bavaria politicians